W.A.K.O. European Championships 2002 in Jesolo was the sixteenth European championships to be held by the W.A.K.O.  It was the second championship to be held in Jesolo and the seventh (including world championships) to be held in Italy.  W.A.K.O. had originally hoped to have a joint event that year like they had with the last world championships, with an event in Greece in October and another in Hungary (and then Slovakia) in November, but due to the difficulties involved they scrapped the idea and resorted to Jesolo which had held a successful event two years previously.

The event was open to amateur men and women from across Europe (with Iran rather unusually participating at a Euro championships) and there were seven styles available; Full Contact, Low-Kick (men only), Thai-Boxing (men only), Light-Contact, Semi-Contact, Musical Forms and Aero-Kickboxing (making its W.A.K.O. debut).  Each country was allowed one competitor per weight division in all styles expect Musical Forms and Aero-Kickboxing, although some contestants were allowed to participate in more than one style (mainly the case with Semi and Light-Contact).  By the end of the championships Russia was the strongest nation overall, with the hosts Italy in second and Belarus in the third.  The event was held over six days in the Palasport Cornaro in Jesolo Italy, beginning on Friday November 22 and ending on Wednesday, November 27th, 2002.

Full-Contact

Full-Contact is a style of kickboxing where punches and kicks are allowed to be thrown by the participants at full force, with strikes below the waist prohibited.  Most fights result in a judge’s decision or stoppage victory and as with most other forms of amateur kickboxing, head and various body protection must be worn.  More information on Full-Contact and the rules can be found at the official W.A.K.O. website.  At Jesolo the men had twelve weight divisions ranging from 51 kg/112.2 lbs to over 91 kg/+200.2 lbs, while the women had seven ranging from 48 kg/105.6 lbs to over 70 kg/+143 lbs.  Notable winners included a young Muamer Hukić (more commonly known as the cruiserweight boxing champion Marco Huck) and there were a number of repeat winners from the last world championships in Belgrade with Ramadani Besnik, Fouad Habbani, Olesya Gladkova, Oxana Vassileva, Barbara Plazzoli and Marjut Lappalainen all picking up gold medals.  By the end of the championships Russia were easily the top nation in Full-Contact winning eight gold, one silver and two bronze medals.

Men's Full-Contact Kickboxing Medals Table

Women's Full-Contact Kickboxing Medals Table

Low-Kick

Low-Kick is a style of kickboxing wherein punches and kicks are allowed to be thrown by the participants at full force, only differing from Full-Contact in that kicks to the leg are also allowed.  Most fights result in a point's decision or stoppage victory and as with most other forms of amateur kickboxing, head and various body protection must be worn.  More information on Low-Kick rules can be found at the W.A.K.O. website.  Available to men only there were twelve weight divisions in Jesolo, ranging from 51 kg/112.2 lbs to over 91 kg/+200.2 lbs.  While there were few notable winners Evgeniy Khil and Ivan Sočo were double winners having also won gold at the last world championships in Belgrade and future K-1 MAX and SuperLeague fighter Luis Reis won a silver medal.  By the championships end Russia was the strongest nation in the style, amassing four golds, three silvers and one bronze.

Men's Low-Kick Kickboxing Medals Table

Thai-Boxing

Thai-boxing (more commonly known as Muay Thai is the most physical style of kickboxing in which the contestants use punches, kicks, elbows and knees to attempt to defeat their opponent, often by referee stoppage or via a point's decision.  As with other forms of amateur kickboxing, participants must wear head and body protection.  At Jesolo the category was open to men only with just nine weight divisions ranging from 57 kg/125.4 lbs to over 91 kg/+200.2 lbs - three down from Belgrade where there were twelve.  The lower than anticipated number of contestants can be explained due to the emergency moving of the W.A.K.O. event, originally a joint event, to Jesolo on a weekend which also included two other international amateur Muay Thai events – the I.A.M.T.F. European championships in Portugal and the I.F.M.A. World Championships in Paris.  Despite missing some of Europe's top fighters the event had several notable winners in Dmitry Shakuta and Ivan Tolkachev who had won gold at the last world championships in Belgrade, as well as Vasily Shish who like the two mentioned before would win multiple world and European titles.  By the end of the event Belarus were easily the top nation in Thai-Boxing winning five golds and one silver.

Men's Thai-Boxing Medals Table

Light-Contact

Light-Contact is a form of kickboxing where points are scored on speed and technique and strikes must be thrown with moderate (not full force).  It is less physical than Full-Contact but more so than Semi and is often seen as a transitional stage between the two and as with other forms of amateur kickboxing head and body protection must be worn.  More detail on Light-Contact and the rules can be found on the W.A.K.O. website.  Both men and women participated in the style with the men having eight weight divisions (one less than at Maribor) ranging from 63 kg/138.6  lbs to over 94 kg/+206.8 lbs while the women had six ranging from 50 kg/110 lbs to over 70 kg/154 lbs.  Although not full of recognisable names there were a number of repeat winners at Jesolo with Marcel Pekonja, Zoltan Dancso, Wojciech Szczerbinski, Szilvia Csicsely and Nadja Sibila all having won gold medals at the last world championships in Maribor.  By the end of the event Poland was the strongest nation in the style winning five golds, three silvers and two bronze medals.

Men's Light-Contact Kickboxing Medals Table

Women's Light-Contact Kickboxing Medals Table

Semi-Contact

Semi-Contact is the least physical of the contact kickboxing styles available at W.A.K.O. events.  It involves the participants throwing controlled strikes at targets above the waist, with point's scored on the basis of speed and technique with power prohibited.  Despite the less physical nature all contestants must wear head and various body protection - more detail on the Semi-Contact and the rules can be found on the official W.A.K.O. website.  Both men and women participated in the style with the men having nine weight divisions ranging from 57 kg/125.4 lbs to over 94 kg/+206.8 lbs and the women having six ranging from 50 kg/110 lbs to over 70 kg/154 lbs.  Not full of noticeable names there were a number of repeat winners with Dezső Debreczeni, Samantha Aquilano, Luisa Lico and Nadja Sibila all having won gold at the last world championships in Maribor.  By the championships end Great Britain were the strongest country in Semi-Contact winning four golds, one silver and one bronze medal.

Men's Semi-Contact Kickboxing Medals Table

Women's Semi-Contact Kickboxing Medals Table

Musical Forms

Musical Forms is a non-physical competition which sees the contestants fighting against imaginary foes using Martial Arts techniques - more information on the style can be found on the W.A.K.O. website.  The men and women competed in four different styles explained below:

Hard Styles – coming from Karate and Taekwondo. 
Soft Styles – coming from Kung Fu and Wu-Sha. 
Hard Styles with Weapons – using weapons such as Kama, Sai, Tonfa, Nunchaku, Bō, Katana. 
Soft Styles with Weapons - using weapons such as Naginata, Nunchaku, Tai Chi Chuan Sword, Whip Chain.

Notable winners included Christian Brell, Andrei Roukavistnikov, Sandra Hess and Veronica Dombrovskaya who added to the winners medals they had collected at the last world championships in Maribor, with Dombrovskaya also being a double winner in Musical Forms at Jesolo.  By the end of the championships Belarus were the strongest nation in the style, winning three gold medals, one silver and one bronze overall.

Men's Musical Forms Medals Table

Women's Musical Forms Medals Table

Aero-Kickboxing

Aero-Kickboxing made its debut at a W.A.K.O. championships in Jesolo.  Like Musical Forms it is a non physical competition involving aerobic and kickboxing techniques in time to specifically selected music – more information on Aero-Kickboxing and the rule set can be found on the W.A.K.O. website.  There were three categories in Jesolo; male, female and a mixed sex team event.  By the end of the championships France was the top nation making a clean sweep of all three gold medal positions.

Men's Aero-Kickboxing Medals Table

Women's Aero-Kickboxing Medals Table

Aero-Kickboxing (Team) Medals Table

Overall Medals Standing (Top 5)

See also
List of WAKO Amateur European Championships
List of WAKO Amateur World Championships

References

External links
 WAKO World Association of Kickboxing Organizations Official Site

WAKO Amateur European Championships events
Kickboxing in Italy
2002 in kickboxing
Sport in Venice